The 2022 Liga 3 Bali season was the fifth season of Liga 3 Bali as a qualifying round for the national round of the 2022–23 Liga 3. It began on 14 August and ended with a final on 18 September 2022. Perseden were the two-time defending champion and they successfully defended their title following a 6–5 win on penalties against Singaraja ZFP in the final.

Teams
There are 15 teams participated in the league this season.

Name changes 
On 5 June 2022, during the 2022 PSSI Bali Province Association Ordinary Congress, two teams had their name change requests accepted by the federation:
 PS Klungkung changed its name to Semarapura United.
 Bintang Persi changed its name to Bintang Bali.

First round
In this round, teams were divided into three groups of five teams (groups A to C). Teams in each group played one another in a round-robin, with the top two teams advanced to the second round.

All times listed below are Central Indonesia Time (WITA).

Group A
All matches were held at the Yoga Perkanthi Stadium, Badung Regency.

Group B
All matches were held at the Pecangakan Stadium, Jembrana Regency.

Group C
All matches were held at the Debes Stadium, Tabanan Regency.

Second round
In this round, competing teams were divided into two groups of three teams (groups X to Y). Teams in each group played one another in a round-robin, with the top two teams advanced to the knockout stage. All matches were held at the Yoga Perkanthi Stadium, Badung Regency.

All times listed below are Central Indonesia Time (WITA).

Group X

Group Y

Knockout stage
All times listed below are Central Indonesia Time (WITA).

Bracket

Semi-finals

Third place play-off

Final

References

Liga 3
Sport in Bali